Perkin is a surname. Notable people with the surname include:

Graham Perkin (1929–1975), Australian journalist and newspaper editor
Richard Scott Perkin (1906–1969), American entrepreneur
William Henry Perkin (1838–1907), English chemist
William Henry Perkin, Jr. (1860–1929), English organic chemist, son of William Henry Perkin
Arthur George Perkin (1861–1937), English chemist, son of William Henry Perkin

See also
Perkins
Parkin (surname)
Parkins

English-language surnames
Surnames of English origin
Surnames from given names